Balaji Wafers is a major snack food manufacturer and distributor in Gujarat, India. It produces and distributes a variety of potato chips and other grain-based snack foods.

History 
 
The company is owned by Chandubhai Virani. Chandubhai and his brothers Bhikhubhai and Kanubhai migrated from a small Village Dhun Dhoraji, Kalavad Taluka, Jamnagar district of Gujarat. Their father Popatbhai Virani was a farmer, who sold ancestral agriculture land and gave  to them to venture into business.
 
The Viranis invested in farm equipment but could not succeed and lost the money. Kakubhai and his brothers started a wafer business from a canteen of a astron cinema hall in Rajkot in 1974. Until 1989, the wafers were produced at the Viranis' house and distributed in and around Rajkot city.
 
In the initial stage, Balaji Wafers set up their plant at Aji Vasad (Industrial Zone, Rajkot) with a new concept of making potato chips. The main benefit they got is the readymade infrastructure availability due to which their cost was reduced to a large extent. They operated there for around 22 years.

Balaji Wafers then set up a fully automatic plant near Metoda G.I.D.C. which is in the area of the village Vajdi, outside the town of Rajkot.

Market share

Balaji's share of the local potato and vegetable chips market grew from 9.5% in 2008, to 13.7% in 2012, according to Euromonitor. Balaji also dominates in the western market with a share of 71%. In its home state Gujarat, it has a share of 90%. The Economic Times recognized Balaji Wafers as 'Sultan of Wafers'.

Balaji Wafers is also a member of the Snack Food Association (SFA).

Products 
Namkeen(23 products)— Yumstix, Punjabi Tadka, Sago Balls, Khatta Mitha Mix, Tikha Mitha Mix, Mitha Farali Chiwda, Farali Chevdo, Chana Jor Garam, Bhel Mix, Mung Dal, Chana Dal, Masala Peas, Shing Bhujia, Nimbu Shing Bhujia, Salted Peanuts, Masala Shing, Aloo Sev, Classic Sev, Bhujia Sev, Gathiya, Ratlami Sev, Sev Murmura, Masala Sev Murmura.

Wafers(12 products)— Stack Up- Sizzling Chilli, Stack Up Salted, Wafers- Simply Salted, Wafers- Masala Masti, Wafers- Tomato Twist, Wafers- Chaat Chaska, Wafers- Cream & Onion, Peri Peri Wafers, Wafers- Pizzy Masala, Crunchex- Simply Salted, Crunchex- Chilli Tadka, Rumbles- Pudina Twist.

Western Snacks(12 products)— Gippi Noodles, Moon Crunchies- Masala, Flamin Hot Nachos, Tomato Salsa Nachos, Cheese Chilli Nachos, Funne- Spicy Punch, Scoopitos, Poprings- Yummy Cheese, Poprings Masala, Wheelos- Masala, Chataka Pataka- Flamin Hot, Chataka Pataka- Chinese Chaska.

References

External links
 

Food and drink companies of India
Companies based in Gujarat
Economy of Gujarat
Brand name potato chips and crisps
Indian brands
Indian companies established in 1976
1976 establishments in Gujarat
Food and drink companies established in 1976
Rajkot